Brandon Deville (born 17 February 1993) is a Belgian footballer who plays for Sporting Hasselt. He plays as a defensive midfielder.

Career
Deville was born in Verviers, Belgium.

On 27 June 2012, Deville signed a two-year contract for French side AC Ajaccio. He left the youth ranks from R.S.C. Anderlecht for a professional career at Corsica. However, he didn't make any appearance during the 2012–13 season. He made his Ligue 1 debut at 25 August 2013 for AC Ajaccio at home to OGC Nice. He replaced Chahir Belghazouani after 71 minutes in a 0–0 draw at Stade François Coty.

At the end of his contract with AC Ajaccio, Deville signed with Lommel United in June 2015.

Ahead of the 2019-20 season, Deville joined Sporting Hasselt.

References

External links
 
 
 

1993 births
Living people
Association football midfielders
Belgian footballers
AC Ajaccio players
K.V.C. Westerlo players
Lommel S.K. players
Ligue 1 players
Ligue 2 players
Challenger Pro League players
People from Verviers
Footballers from Liège Province